Leopoldo María Panero (16 June 1948 – 5 March 2014) was a Spanish poet, commonly placed in the Novísimos group. Panero is the archetype of a decadence as much cultivated as repudiated, but that decadence has not stopped him from being the first member of his generation in being incorporated to the classic Spanish editorial Cátedra, to have a splendid biography written by J. Benito Fernández (El contorno del abismo, Tusquets, 1999) and being included in the literary history, anthologies and academical programs.

Life
Son of Leopoldo Panero (1909–1962), poet of suggestive voice, and brother of the poet Juan Luis Panero, the young Leopoldo María Panero, as well as so many other descendants of the supporters of Francoist Spain, is fascinated by the radical left party. His anti-Francoist extremism will constitute the first of his disasters and will cost him his first stay in prison.

His first experiences with drugs date back to those youth years too. From alcohol to heroin, to which he would dedicate an impressive collection of poems in 1992, none of them remains unknown to him. In the decade of the 70's he is admitted for the first time in a psychiatric hospital. Nevertheless, his constant internments do not prevent him from developing a copious bibliography not only as a poet, but as a translator, essayist and even narrator.

His various poetic releases appear regularly:

<blockquote>
 Así se fundó Carnaby Street (This is how Carnaby Street was founded) (Ocnos, 1970). In this poetry book, the melancholy of his childhood myths goes parallel with a passionate experimentalism.
 Teoría (Theory) (Lumen, 1973).
 Narciso en el acorde último de las flautas (Narcissus in the last chord of flutes) (Visor, 1979).
 Last River Together (Ayuso, 1980).
 Dioscuros (Ayuso, 1982).
 El último hombre (The last man) (Ediciones Libertarias, 1984).
 Poesía 1970-1985 (Visor, 1986).
 Contra España y otros poema de no amor (Against Spain and other poems of no-love) (Ediciones Libertarias, 1990).
 Agujero llamado Nevermore (Hole called Nevermore) (poetic selection, 1968-1992) (Cátedra, 1992).
 Poemas del Manicomio de Mondragón (Poems from the Mondragón Mental Hospital) (Hiperión, 1999).
 Suplicio en la cruz de la boca (Torture in the cross of the mouth) (El Gato Gris, Ediciones de Poesía, 2000).
 Teoría del miedo (Theory of fear) (Igitur, 2000).
 Poesía Completa (Complete Poetry) (1970-2000) (Visor, 2001).
 Águila contra el hombre : poemas para un suicidamiento (Eagle against man : poems for a suicide) (Valdemar, 2001).
 Esquizofrénicas o la balada de la lámpara azul (Schizophrenics or the ballad of the blue lamp) (Hiperión, 2004).
 Danza de la muerte (Dance of death) (Igitur, 2004).
 Heroin and other poems -bilingual edition- translated by Zachary de los Dolores (Cardboard House Press, 2014)
</blockquote>

His narrative work includes:

 En lugar del hijo (Tusquets, 1976), fantasy short-stories compilation.
 Dos relatos y una perversión (Two short-stories and one perversion) (Ediciones Libertarias, 1984).
 Palabras de un asesino (Words of a murderer), (Ediciones Libertarias, 1999).
 Los héroes inútiles (The useless heroes), (epistolary with the young writer Diego Medrano), (Ellago Ediciones, 2005)

He also cultivated the essay form:

 Mi cerebro es una rosa (my brain is a rose), (Roger, 1998).
 Prueba de vida. Autobiografía de la muerte (Life proof, autobiography of death), (Huerga y Fierro, 2002).

In one or another way, all his pages, even his translations, are autobiographical. In fact, the keys to his work are self-contemplation and (self)destruction. Nevertheless, as Pere Gimferrer already pointed out in 1971, the theme of his poetry "is not the destruction of adolescence: it is its triumph, and the destruction and disintegration of the adult conscience with it". To liberate adolescence like emotional energy, creating an own mythology, not official, it is the assumed attitude by Panero from the very beginning.

He died 5 March 2014 at the age of 65.

Last River Together

Last River Together is a  poetry book written by Spanish author Leopoldo María Panero. It is a good text in which to find all the characteristics of his poetry.

The first thing that can be seen in this poem are the culturalist elements that appear in a more or less explicit form:

The title, of clear cinematographic evocation.
The quote that headlines the text: Fifteen men over the Dead Man's Chest/ Fifteen men over the Dead Man's Chest/ Yahoo! And a bottle of rum!, which is the song that the pirates sing in Robert L. Stevenson's "The treasure island" (evidently, there is also a film adaptation).
An evocation of "La vida es sueño" from Calderón de la Barca (And dream that I have lived...).
Mentions Fernando Pessoa and his heteronims: (I say to myself that I am Pessoa, like Pessoa was Álvaro Campos).
The reference to "Dulce pájaro de juventud" (Sweet Bird of Youth, theatre play by Tennessee Williams, which was brought to film by Richard Brooks in 1962 and which tells how a bon viveur has to leave his hometown, after seducing the boss's daughter. Installed in Hollywood he will become the lover of an autumn star).
The contradiction to Larra (To write in Spain is not to cry).
The reference to the European philosopher Ludwig Wittgenstein.
Mentioning the French writer Rémy de Gourmont (1858–1915) and his "Le Livre Des Masques". "Portraits symbolistes", "Glosses et Documents sur les Ecrivains d'hier et d'aujourd'hui", "in-18", "Societé du Mercure de France, Paris, 1896.

Secondly the many repetitions of words, syntactic structures, more or less complete verses. Repetitions that seem to be used to create a kind of obsessive rhythm (let's keep in mind that the poem is a "song") as to give the text the appearance of an inner monologue.

Finally, the different themes that appear in the poem should be pointed out: the autobiographical, the blaspheming, the life as a dream, the anti-Spainism (not in vain, one of his poetry books is entitled "Against Spain and other poems of no-love"), the damnation (ruin is so beautiful''), as well notions of mental illness and pop culture. Themes that, in one way or another, repeat, modify and mix each other to give the poem that character of obsessive inner monologue, already mentioned.

References

External links 
  Spanish Schizophrenic Poet Lauded

1948 births
2014 deaths
People from Madrid
Novísimos
Spanish male poets
20th-century Spanish poets
20th-century Spanish male writers
Spanish gay writers
Spanish LGBT poets